Karanga is a Maban language spoken in Chad. Its speakers are divided into four groups, each of which has its own dialect: the Karanga (Kurunga), Kashmere (Kachmere), Bakha (Baxa, Bakhat) a.k.a. Fala (Faala), and Koniéré (Konyare, Kognere) a.k.a. Moyo (Mooyo). Karanga is closely related to the Masalit language.

References

Maban languages
Languages of Chad